Joseph Pera (born July 24, 1988) is an American comedian, writer and actor. He is best known as the creator and star of Adult Swim's Joe Pera Talks with You, which entered development following the success of the 2016 specials Joe Pera Talks You to Sleep, and ran for three seasons.

Early life
Joe Pera was born in Buffalo, New York. He studied film at Ithaca College, where he competed in and won the college's stand-up competition three times. Pera graduated from Ithaca College in 2010. He moved to New York City to pursue comedy and would attend open mic nights as often as possible. Pera is a fan of his hometown Buffalo Bills.

Career
Known for his slow, "grandfatherly" delivery and his penchant for wearing sweaters, Pera created the Adult Swim Infomercial Joe Pera Talks You to Sleep. This was followed by an appearance on Late Night with Seth Meyers, and another stand-alone Adult Swim special titled Joe Pera Helps You Find the Perfect Christmas Tree. Thanks to the success of those programs (all produced by Chestnut Walnut, founded by him and Conner O'Malley), Pera developed a television series for Adult Swim, which premiered on May 20, 2018, titled Joe Pera Talks with You. He appeared on the talk show Conan on March 28, 2017, and on The Late Show with Stephen Colbert on December 4, 2019. In 2021, Joe Pera released a book named A Bathroom Book for People Not Pooping or Peeing but Using the Bathroom as an Escape which was illustrated by Joe Bennett.

Filmography

Film

Television

YouTube series

References

External links
 
 
 Joe Pera Talks You to Sleep on YouTube
 Chestnut Walnut Unlimited website

1988 births
Living people
21st-century American comedians
21st-century American male actors
21st-century American male writers
American comedy writers
American male comedians
American male television actors
American stand-up comedians
American television writers
Comedians from New York (state)
Ithaca College alumni
Male actors from Buffalo, New York
American male television writers
Screenwriters from New York (state)
Television personalities from New York (state)
Writers from Buffalo, New York
21st-century American screenwriters